The Tadrès Total Reserve (T'adéras/Tadress) (Réserve totale de Faune du Tadrès) is a nature reserve in the central north of Niger, southwest the city of Agadez. It is a Total Faunal Reserve  IUCN type IV, covering some 788,928 hectares  within the Agadez Region.  The reserve follows the northeast - southwest flow of the Tadrès valley, a Kori or seasonal wash and ancient river bed south of the Aïr Mountains.  It was originally dedicated to the protection of Oryx populations which have largely disappeared from the region. In the 1940s, the valley was an important migration route for the animals from the Tenere desert to the Adar in the south of the country. It remains a transhumance route for domesticated cattle and camels, as well as wild  Dorcas and Ménas Gazelles

References

 UNEP-WCMC site record
 World Database on Protected Areas / UNEP-World Conservation Monitoring Centre (UNEP-WCMC), 2008.
 Biodiversity and Protected Areas-- Niger, Earth Trends country profile (2003)

National parks of Niger